Mousetrapping is a technique used by some websites (often tech support scam sites) to keep visitors from leaving their website, either by launching an endless series of pop-up ads, redirects or by re-launching their website in a window that cannot be easily closed; sometimes this window runs like a stand-alone application, and the taskbar and the browser's menu become inaccessible. Many such websites also employ browser hijackers to reset the user's default homepage.

The Federal Trade Commission has brought suits against mousetrappers, charging that the practice is a deceptive and unfair competitive practice, in violation of section 5 of the FTC Act. Typically, mousetrappers register URLs with misspelled names of celebrities (e.g. BrittnaySpears.com) or companies (e.g. BettyCroker.com and WallStreetJournel.com). Thus, if someone seeking the BettyCrocker website typed BettyCroker, the user would become ensnared in the mousetrapper's system. Once the viewer is at the site, a Javascript or a click induced by, as one example, promises of free samples, redirects the viewer to a URL and regular site of the mousetrapper's client-advertiser, who (the FTC said in the Zuccarini case) pays 10 to 25 cents for capturing and redirecting each potential customer. An FTC press release explaining why the agency opposes mousetrapping states:

See also
Phishing
Typosquatting
Clickjacking

References

External links
 Mousetrapping and Pagejacking by Richard H. Stern
 "Is Mousetrapping Unfair?", IEEE MICRO (Nov.-Dec. 2001)

Internet terminology